Paynesville is a tourist/holiday resort town in the Gippsland region of Victoria, Australia. At the 2016 census, Paynesville had a population of 3,480. It is known as the boating capital of Victoria.

History
Paynesville was originally called Toonalook, which is an aboriginal name for "place of many fish". The post office opened on 8 November 1879 as Toonalook and was renamed Paynesville in 1886 by the Dickson family, who still reside in the area.

Raymond Island
Raymond Island is a small island accessible via the Raymond Island Ferry.  The island is predominantly residential and is well known for its large koala population. It has been at the centre of continued local debate over the construction of a bridge to allow for better access and further development.

The town today

Paynesville is a thriving town well served by a range of shops, cafes, a bank and a newly built community centre and library. Much of the town's recent growth has stemmed from the development of a network of canals and prestige homes which have created two artificial islands within the township. Burrabogie Island is north of the waterfront shopping district,  and Fort King Island is a residential area north of Burrabogie Island. Although Burrabogie and Fort King Island are separated only by an approximate 45-metre-wide man-made canal, they are the most distant points in Paynesville by road.

Sports 
Paynesville is also well represented in the sporting arena, with sailing, bowls, tennis and netball clubs in the town, as well as a thriving local football and cricket club, the latter having won back to back Grand Finals in the Bairnsdale Cricket Association for 2007 and 2008. The town has an Australian Rules football team competing in the East Gippsland Football League. The team last won a premiership in 2013.

The Gippsland Lakes Yacht Club (GLYC), established in 1938, whose facilities include a fully licensed bar, club rooms with lake views, launching area with ramp, crane, and mooring jetties. The club has wet berth, hardstand and undercover boat storage. Classes raced include Flying 15s, Mosquitos, Sabres, Castle 650s, Sonata 6/7s, Magnum 8.5s, Timpenny 770s, and a mixed fleet of dinghys, trailer-sailers and keelboats. The club conducts sail training and sailability programs.

Fishing 
It is located on the eastern end of Lake Victoria, near Lake King, two of the larger Gippsland Lakes and is a good launching point for exploring the lakes.  It provided access to some of the best fishing to be found in Victoria, however, fish stocks have been significantly depleted through over-fishing, nutrient run-off and destruction of sea-grass habitat.

Tourism 
Other tourist attractions in the area include:
 Paynesville Maritime Museum
 Raymond Island - well known locally for its large koala population.
 Ninety Mile Beach - accessible by boat from the town.
 The Lakes National Park

Nearby towns include Bairnsdale, Metung, Eagle Point, and Lakes Entrance.

Education
Carey Baptist Grammar School has an outdoor education camp near Paynesville called Carey Toonallook (sic).

References

External links
 Official East Gippsland tourism website

Fishing communities in Australia
Towns in Victoria (Australia)
Shire of East Gippsland